El Jagüel is a city in Esteban Echeverría Partido, Buenos Aires Province, Argentina. It was founded on 23 September 1951.

Geography

Location
El Jagüel is located on both sides of Provincial Route 205. It borders the Ezeiza Partido, and the towns of Monte Grande and Canning.

It is crossed by the Arroyo Ortega. The area is made up mostly of workers and small and medium-sized entrepreneurs. The commercial developments are located in the central streets, next to Route 205 and on the main street of the city (called "Evita"), which extends from the eponymous railway station to Avenida Pedro Dreyer, which in turn joins the Provincial Routes 4, 52 and 58.

Barrios

History
El Jagüel was formed from the division and urbanization of land carried out by a real estate company in the 1950s. At that time, the place was an open field, with little presence of houses. In 1954, several inhabitants settled who acquired plots in the area, and built their homes with minimal comfort. There were no schools, there was no lighting, and they depended on the Monte Grande and Ezeiza train stations, the closest ones. The neighborhood was electrified in 1957, and a short time later the railway station corresponding to the Constitución-Ezeiza branch of the Roca Line was created, facilitating population growth and economic progress.

References

External links

Populated places in Buenos Aires Province
Esteban Echeverría Partido
Cities in Argentina
Populated places established in 1951
1951 establishments in Argentina